Dichloroacetylene (DCA) is an organochlorine compound with the formula C2Cl2. It is a colorless, explosive liquid that has a sweet and "disagreeable" odor.

Production
Dichloroacetylene was first synthesized in 1930.

Ether solutions of dichloroacetylene are relatively stable, and such solution can be safely generated by dehydrochlorination of trichlorethylene. A popular procedure use potassium hydride as the base:
Cl2C=CHCl + KH  →  ClC≡CCl  +  KCl  +  H2
A trace of methanol is required.

It has also been generated (and used in situ) using lithium diisopropylamide under anhydrous conditions as well as potassium hydroxide. 
Dichloroacetylene is stabilized in the presence of ether, with which it forms an azeotrope (boiling point of 32 °C), and trichloroethylene.

Adventitious routes
It is a by-product in the production of vinylidene chloride. For instance, it can be formed from trichloroethylene. It is also possible to produce dichloroacetylene from trichloroethylene at low concentrations by running the trichloroethylene through nitrogen at 120° Celsius in the presence of dry potassium hydroxide. 

Dichloroacetylene can occur and be stable in air at concentrations of up to 200 parts per million if certain other compounds are also present.

Reactions
Dichloroacetylene reacts with oxygen to give phosgene:
ClC≡CCl  +  O2  →  Cl2CO  +  CO

Dichloroacetylene, being electrophilic, adds nucleophiles, such as amines:
ClC≡CCl  +  R2NH  →  Cl(H)C=CCl(NR2)

Biological role and toxicity 
Dichloroacetylene causes neurological disorders, among other problems. 
Studies on male rats and rabbits have shown that inhalation of dichloroacetylene can cause tubular necrosis, focal necrosis, and other nephrotoxic effects. Additionally, the rabbits that were given dichloroacetylene experienced hepatotoxic and neuropathological effects. Inhalation of dichloroacetylene also causes benign tumors of the livers and kidneys of rats. The chemical also caused increased incidences of lymphomas. It also causes weight loss in animals. 3.5% of a dose of dichloroacetylene remains in the corpses of male Wistar rats. The LD50s of mice exposed to dichloroacetylene are 124 parts per million for a 1-hour exposure by inhalation and 19 parts per million for a 6-hour exposure by inhalation. The chemical is ingested primarily through glutathione-dependent systems. Glutathione also reacts with it. Hepatitic and renal glutathione S-transferases serve as catalysts to this reaction. While dichloroacetylene is nephrotoxic in rats, it does not show any signs of nephrotoxicity in humans.

Dichloroacetylene has mutagenic effects on Salmonella typhimurium.

The maximum safe concentration of dichloroacetylene in air is 0.1 parts per million. It is unsafe to store dichloroacetylene in close proximity to potassium, sodium, or aluminum powder.

Like trichloroethylene, dichloroacetylene is metabolized to DCVC in vivo.

According to the Department of Transportation, it is forbidden to ship dichloroacetylene.

Additional reading

See also 
 Difluoroacetylene
 Diiodoacetylene
 Organochloride

References 

Organochlorides
Dihaloacetylenes
Toxins
Explosive chemicals
Liquid explosives
Sweet-smelling chemicals